Royal Albert may refer to several places named in memory of Prince Albert of Saxe-Coburg and Gotha:
Royal Albert Hall, London
Royal Albert Bridge, near Plymouth, England
Royal Albert Dock, Liverpool, England
Royal Albert Dock, London
Royal Albert DLR station, a station on the Docklands Light Railway, London

Other uses
Royal Albert, a brand name for pottery owned by Fiskars and previously by Royal Doulton
Royal Albert F.C., a Scottish football club, based in Larkhall
Hawick Royal Albert F.C., another Scottish football club, based in Hawick
HMS Royal Albert, a 121-gun Royal Navy ship of the line